The 2009–10 South Dakota Coyotes men's basketball team represented the University of South Dakota in the 2009–10 NCAA Division I men's basketball season. The Coyotes were led by head coach Dave Boots in his 22nd year leading the team. South Dakota played their home games at the DakotaDome in Vermillion, South Dakota, as members of the Great West Conference. 

The Coyotes finished conference play with an 11–1 record and won the Great West Conference regular season title.

As a recently formed conference, the Great West Conference was not eligible for an automatic bid to the NCAA tournament. Instead, as the Great West champion, South Dakota was given an automatic bid to the 2010 CIT. The Coyotes were eliminated in the first round of the CIT by Creighton, 89-78.

The Coyotes finished the season with a 22–10 record.

Roster 

Source

Schedule and results

|-
!colspan=9 style=|Regular season

|-
!colspan=9 style=| Great West tournament

|-
!colspan=9 style=| CollegeInsider.com tournament

References

South Dakota Coyotes men's basketball seasons
South Dakota
South Dakota
South Dakota men's basketball
South Dakota men's basketball